Baghan Rural District is a rural district (dehestan) in Mahmeleh District, Khonj County, Fars Province, Iran. At the 2006 census, its population was 3,274, in 664 families.  The rural district has 6 villages.

References 

Rural Districts of Fars Province
Khonj County